"Sunday Mornin' Comin' Down" is a song written by Kris Kristofferson that was recorded in 1969 by Ray Stevens before becoming a No.1 hit on the Billboard US Country chart for Johnny Cash.

History
Stevens' version of the song reached No.55 on the Billboard Hot Country Singles chart and No.81 on the Hot 100 pop chart in 1969. In 2021, it was listed at #476 on Rolling Stone's "Top 500 Best Songs of All Time". It also appeared on the author's own album Kristofferson.

In a 2013 interview, Kristofferson said the song "opened up a whole lot of doors for me. So many people that I admired, admired it. Actually, it was the song that allowed me to quit working for a living."

Johnny Cash version

The biggest success on disc for the song came from a Johnny Cash performance that had been taped live at the Ryman Auditorium during a taping of The Johnny Cash Show as part of a "Ride This Train" segment, with filmed background visuals showing a down-and-out wanderer roaming around the Public Square area of Shelbyville, Tennessee. Cash introduced the song with the following monologue:

"You know, not everyone who has been on 'the bum' wanted it that way. The Great Depression of the 30s set the feet of thousands of people—farmers, city workers—it set 'em to ridin' the rails. My Daddy was one of those who hopped a freight train a couple of times to go and look for work. He wasn't a bum. He was a hobo but he wasn't a bum. I suppose we've all....all of us 'been at one time or another 'drifter at heart', and today like yesterday there's many that are on that road headin' out. Not searchin' maybe for work, as much as for self-fulfillment, or understanding of their life...trying to find a *meaning* for their life. And they're not hoppin' freights much anymore. Instead they're thumbin' cars and diesel trucks along the highways from Maine to Mexico. And many who have drifted...including myself...have found themselves no closer to peace of mind than a dingy backroom, on some lonely Sunday morning, with it comin' down all around you."

With the monologue edited off, the recording would appear on the soundtrack LP The Johnny Cash Show the following year, as well as being issued as a single (Columbia Records 4-45211). Cash's version won the Country Music Association Award for Song of the Year in 1970 and hit #1 on the country chart.

This version was used in the Columbo episode Swan Song in 1974, in which Cash performed it during a garden party.

According to Kristofferson, network executives ordered Cash to change the line "I'm wishing Lord that I was stoned" when he performed the song on his TV show, but he refused to comply.

Other versions
Lynn Anderson - with some lyrics slightly changed to represent a female's point of view - on her 1970 album Rose Garden.

Sammi Smith, for her 1970 album He's Everywhere.

Roy Clark, on his 1970 album I Never Picked Cotton.

Waylon Jennings included it on his 1971 album The Taker/Tulsa.

Telly Savalas recorded it for his 1975 self–titled album.

Frankie Laine, on his 1977 British album Life is Beautiful.

Mark Lindsay took his turn with it on his 1970 album Arizona.

Shawn Mullins, on his 1998 album Soul's Core.

The Handsome Family cut a track of it for their 2002 odds-and-ends compilation album Smothered and Covered.

In 2006, the band Me First And The Gimme Gimmes included it on their album Love Their Country.

Jerry Lee Lewis, for his 2010 album Mean Old Man.

Willie Nelson included it on his 1971 album Willie Nelson and Family, his 1979 album Sings Kristofferson, and more recently on his 2011 album Remember Me, Vol. 1.

Gretchen Wilson recorded her take on the song for the Kris Kristofferson tribute The Pilgrim: A Celebration of Kris Kristofferson in 2006 to celebrate Kristofferson's 70th birthday.

Jesse Morris, in a YouTube video circa 2010 at a subway station.

Chart performance

Ray Stevens

Johnny Cash

References

Johnny Cash songs
Kris Kristofferson songs
Ray Stevens songs
1969 songs
Songs written by Kris Kristofferson
Song recordings produced by Bob Johnston
Columbia Records singles
1970 singles